Jacques Camou (1 May 1792 – 8 February 1868) was a French general in the armies of Emperor Napoleon III.

Biography

With the troops of Napoleon I he served in the Peninsular War and in Italy.

His military career was interrupted when the French armies were dissolved in 1815, but in 1817, he served again as a lieutenant. He participated in 1823 in the French expedition to Spain.

In 1830 he was sent to Algeria, where he would rise to the rank of brigadier general in 1848. Four years later, he was promoted to the rank of major general and made commander of the division of Algiers.

Subsequently, Camou commanded the 2nd Infantry Division of the Imperial Guard in the Crimean War—where he participated in the Siege of Sevastopol and in the Battle of Chernaya River in 1855—and in the Second Italian War of Independence in 1859.

Legacy
Until 1967, the street was called just .

References
Faucon, N.: , Vol. I; Challamel & Cie, Paris 1889. URL last accessed 2007-02-21.
Hillairet, J.; Payen-Appenzeller, P.: , 8th ed., Editions de Minuit, Paris, 1985. .

1792 births
1868 deaths
People from Béarn
French generals
French military personnel of the Napoleonic Wars
French military personnel of the Crimean War
Place of death missing
People of the Second Italian War of Independence